Listromycter is an extinct genus of worm lizard from the Early Miocene of Kenya, Africa. It had a skull 36mm in size, the largest known for an amphisbaenian.

References

 Fossils (Smithsonian Handbooks) by David Ward (Page 232)

Amphisbaenians
Miocene lepidosaurs
Miocene reptiles of Africa
Fossil taxa described in 1990